New Directions Publishing Corp. is an independent book publishing company that was founded in 1936 by James Laughlin and incorporated in 1964. Its offices are located at 80 Eighth Avenue in New York City.

History

New Directions was born in 1936 of Ezra Pound's advice to the young James Laughlin, then a Harvard University sophomore, to "do something useful" after finishing his studies at Harvard. The first projects to come out of New Directions were anthologies of new writing, each titled New Directions in Poetry and Prose (until 1966's NDPP 19). Early writers incorporated in these anthologies include Dylan Thomas, Marianne Moore, Wallace Stevens, Thomas Merton, Denise Levertov, James Agee, and Lawrence Ferlinghetti.

New Directions later broadened their focus to include writing of all genres, representing not only American writing, but also a considerable amount of literature in translation from modernist authors around the world. New Directions also published the early work of many writers including Ezra Pound and William Carlos Williams, and Tennessee Williams was published as a poet for the very first time in a New Directions poetry collection.

Laughlin also initiated a number of thematic series and publications. The New Directions "Poet of the Month" series consisted of thin volumes of either lengthy individual poems or small collections of poems by one author were released on a monthly basis to subscribers, and a larger "Poet of the Year" volume was issued once annually. The series were discontinued after a few years. "Directions" began in 1941 as a quarterly soft-bound journal, with each edition dedicated to a single author or work in prose. Early issues included a collection of short stories by Vladimir Nabokov and a play by William Carlos Williams. The subscription model did not take hold, and later editions in the series were published in more traditional form and sold as individual works to the general public. Another short-lived New Directions periodical, Pharos, was discontinued after its fourth number was published in the winter of 1947.

Other notable undertakings include the New Classics and Modern Readers series, which reissued recent books that had gone out of print. These reprints included such works as Exiles and Stephen Hero by James Joyce and The Great Gatsby by F. Scott Fitzgerald.

After Laughlin's death, New Directions Publishing became owned by a trust established in his will.

Jacket design and colophon
After the time of World War II, New Directions developed a close relationship with the artist Alvin Lustig, who designed modernist abstract book jackets. Lustig was ultimately responsible for developing a distinctive style of dust jacket that served as a New Directions hallmark for many years.

The company's colophon is a figure of a centaur based upon a sculpture by Heinz Henghes, and usually appears on the spine of New Directions books.

Presidents 
 James Laughlin
 Griselda Ohannessian
 Peggy Fox
 Barbara Epler

Awards 
In 1977, New Directions was presented with a Carey Thomas Award special citation for distinguished publishing in experimental literature. New Directions' authors have won numerous national and international awards, including the:

Nobel Prize 
 Tomas Tranströmer, 2011
 Octavio Paz, 1990
 Camilo José Cela, 1989
 Elias Canetti, 1981
 Eugenio Montale, 1975
 Pablo Neruda, 1971
 Yasunari Kawabata, 1968
 Jean-Paul Sartre, 1964
 Saint-John Perse, 1960
 Boris Pasternak, 1958
 Andre Gide, 1947
 Hermann Hesse, 1946
 Frédéric Mistral, 1904

Pulitzer Prize 
 Hilton Als, 2017
 Gary Snyder, 1975
 George Oppen, 1969
 Richard Eberhart, 1966
 William Carlos Williams, 1963
 Tennessee Williams, 1948, 1955
 Robert Penn Warren, 1947, 1958, 1979

National Book Award 
 Yoko Tawada, 2018
 Nathaniel Mackey, 2006

MacArthur Foundation Fellowship 
 John Keene, 2018
 Peter Cole, 2007
 Lydia Davis, 2003
 Anne Carson, 2000
 Guy Davenport, 1990
 Allen Grossman, 1989
 Walter Abish, 1987

PEN/Faulkner Award for Fiction 
 Toby Olson, 1983

Prix Goncourt 
 Mathias Énard, 2015
 Eugène Guillevic, 1988
 Emile Ajar, 1975
 Romain Gary, 1956

Man Booker International Prize 
 Laszlo Krasznahorkai / George Szirtes and Ottilie Mulzet, 2015

Independent Foreign Fiction Prize 
 Jenny Erpenbeck / Susan Bernofsky, 2015

Lenore Marshall Poetry Prize 
 Denise Levertov, 1976

Bollingen Prize in American Poetry 
 Nathaniel Mackey, 2015
 Susan Howe, 2011
 Allen Grossman, 2009
 Robert Creeley, 1999
 Gary Snyder, 1997
 Robert Penn Warren, 1967
 Robert Fitzgerald, 1961
 Delmore Schwartz, 1960
 Ezra Pound, 1948

Robert Frost Medal 
 Susan Howe, 2017
 Kamau Brathwaite, 2015
 Lawrence Ferlinghetti, 2003
 Denise Levertov, 1999
 James Laughlin, 1999
 Robert Creeley, 1987

Windham-Campbell Literature Prize 

 John Keene, 2018
 Hilton Als, 2016

Vilenica Kristal Prize 
 Luljeta Lleshanaku, 2009

Current projects

The current focus of New Directions is threefold: discovering and introducing to the US contemporary international writers; publishing new and experimental American poetry and prose; and reissuing New Directions' classic titles in new editions.

Drawing from the tradition of the early anthologies and series, New Directions launched the Pearl series, which presents short works by New Directions writers in slim, minimalist volumes designed by Rodrigo Corral. Recent additions to the series include On Booze by F. Scott Fitzgerald and The Leviathan by Joseph Roth.[6] New Directions also publishes a selection of academic reading guides to accompany a number of their books, including Hermann Hesse's Siddhartha and The Night of the Iguana by Tennessee Williams.[7]

Authors 
New Directions was the first American publisher of such notables as Vladimir Nabokov, Jorge Luis Borges, and Henry Miller. Today, their authors include:

American literature

 Walter Abish
 Will Alexander 
 John Allman
 Sherwood Anderson
 Wayne Andrews
 David Antin
 Paul Auster
 Jimmy Santiago Baca
 Djuna Barnes
 Lee Bartlett
 Kay Boyle
 William Bronk
 Frederick Busch
 Hayden Carruth
 Tom Clark
 Peter Cole
 Cid Corman

 Gregory Corso
 Robert Creeley
 Guy Davenport
 Edward Dahlberg
 Helen DeWitt
 Debra Di Blasi
 H.D.
 Coleman Dowell
 Robert Duncan
 Richard Eberhart
 William Everson
 Lawrence Ferlinghetti
 Thalia Field
 F. Scott Fitzgerald
 Robert Fitzgerald
 Forrest Gander
 John Gardner

 Allen Grossman
 John Hawkes
 David Hinton
 Susan Howe
 Henry James
 Robinson Jeffers
 Mary Karr
 Bob Kaufman
 Alvin Levin
 Denise Levertov
 Nathaniel Mackey
 Bernadette Mayer
 Carole Maso
 Michael McClure
 Thomas Merton
 Joyce Carol Oates
 Charles Olson

 Toby Olson
 George Oppen
 Michael Palmer
 Kenneth Patchen
 Ezra Pound
 Kenneth Rexroth
 William Saroyan
 Delmore Schwartz
 Frederic Tuten
 Rosmarie Waldrop
 Robert Penn Warren
 Eliot Weinberger
 Nathanael West
 Tennessee Williams
 William Carlos Williams
 Louis Zukofsky

Central American, South American, and Caribbean literature

 César Aira (Argentina)
 Martín Adán (Peru)
 Homero Aridjis (Mexico)
 Roberto Bolaño (Chile)
 Jorge Luis Borges (Argentina)
 Kamau Brathwaite (Caribbean)

 Coral Bracho (México)
 Ernesto Cardenal (Nicaragua)
 Adolfo Bioy Casares (Argentina)
 Horacio Castellanos Moya (El Salvador)
 Julio Cortázar (Argentina)
 Felisberto Hernández (Uruguay)

 Vicente Huidobro (Chile)
 Enrique Lihn (Chile)
 Clarice Lispector (Brazil)
 Pablo Neruda (Chile)
 Nicanor Parra (Chile)
 Octavio Paz (Mexico)

 René Philoctète (Haiti)
 Alejandra Pizarnik (Argentina)
 Rodrigo Rey Rosa (Guatemala)
 Guillermo Rosales (Cuba)
 Evelio Rosero (Colombia)
 Luis Fernando Verissimo (Brazil)

British, Irish, Canadian, and Australian literature

 Valentine Ackland
 H. E. Bates
 Martin Bax
 Carmel Bird
 Sir Thomas Browne
 Edwin Brock
 Christine Brooke-Rose
 Basil Bunting
 Elias Canetti
 Anne Carson
 Joyce Cary

 Douglas Cleverdon
 Maurice Collis
 William Empson
 Caradoc Evans
 Gavin Ewart
 Ronald Firbank
 Henry Green
 Christopher Isherwood
 James Joyce
 B. S. Johnson
 D. H. Lawrence

 Hugh MacDiarmid
 Wilfred Owen
 Caradog Prichard
 Herbert Read
 Peter Dale Scott
 C. H. Sisson
 Stevie Smith
 Muriel Spark
 Dylan Thomas
 Charles Tomlinson

European literature

 Germano Almeida (Cape Verde)
 Corrado Alvaro (Italy)
 Alfred Andersch (Germany)
 Guillaume Apollinaire (France)
 Gennadiy Aygi (Russia)
 Honoré de Balzac (France)
 Jacques Barzun (France)
 Charles Baudelaire (France)
 Gottfried Benn (Germany)
 Nina Berberova (Russia)
 Giuseppe Berto (Italy)
 Johannes Bobrowski (Germany)
 Wolfgang Borchert (Germany)
 Johan Borgen (Norway)
 Alain Bosquet (France)
 Mikhail Bulgakov (Russia)
 Louis-Ferdinand Céline (France)
 Blaise Cendrars (Switzerland)
 René Char (France)
 Inger Christensen (Denmark)
 Jean Cocteau (France)
 Alain Daniélou (France)

 Tibor Déry (Hungary)
 Eugénio de Andrade (Portugal)
 Pierre Choderlos de Laclos (France)
 Madame de La Fayette (France)
 Eça de Queiroz (Portugal)
 Tibor Déry (Hungary)
 Giuseppe Tomasi di Lampedusa (Italy)
 Édouard Dujardin (France)
 Jenny Erpenbeck (Germany)
 Hans Faverey (Netherlands)
 Gustave Flaubert (France)
 Romain Gary (France)
 Wilhelm Genazino (Germany)
 William Gerhardie (Russia)
 Goethe (Germany)
 Nikolai Gogol (Russia)
 Martin Grzimek (Germany)
 Henri Guigonnat (France)
 Eugène Guillevic (France)
 Lars Gustafsson (Sweden)
 Knut Hamsun (Norway)
 Hermann Hesse (Germany)

 Alfred Jarry (France)
 Franz Kafka (Germany/Czech Republic)
 Heinrich von Kleist (Germany)
 Alexander Kluge (Germany)
 László Krasznahorkai (Hungary)
 Dezső Kosztolányi (Hungary)
 Miroslav Krleža (Yugoslavia)
 Siegfried Lenz (Germany)
 Luljeta Lleshanaku (Albania)
 Federico García Lorca (Spain)
 Chantal Maillard (Spain/Belgium)
 Stéphane Mallarmé (France)
 Javier Marías (Spain)
 Henri Michaux (France)
 Frédéric Mistral (France)
 Eugenio Montale (Italy)
 Vladimir Nabokov (Russia)
 Boris Pasternak (Russia)
 Victor Pelevin (Russia)
 Saint-John Perse (France)
 Raymond Queneau (France)
 Rainer Maria Rilke (Germany)
 Arthur Rimbaud (France)

 Joseph Roth (Austria)
 W. G. Sebald (Germany)
 Jean-Paul Sartre (French)
 Dag Solstad (Norway)
 Stendhal (France)
 Antonio Tabucchi (Italy)
 Yoko Tawada (Japan/Germany)
 Uwe Timm (Germany)
 Leonid Tsypkin (Russia)
 Tomas Tranströmer (Sweden)
 Dubravka Ugrešić (Yugoslavia)
 Paul Valéry (France)
 Enrique Vila-Matas (Spain)
 Elio Vittorini (Italy)
 Robert Walser (Switzerland)
Zinovy Zinik (Russia)

Chinese and Japanese literature

 Ah Cheng (China)
 Gu Cheng (China)
 Bei Dao (China)
 Osamu Dazai (Japan)
 Shūsaku Endō (Japan)
 Tu Fu (China)

 Kōno Taeko (Japan)
 Yukio Mishima (Japan)
 Teru Miyamoto (Japan)
 Li Po (China)
 Li Qingzhao (China)
 Ihara Saikaku (Japan)

 Kazuko Shiraishi (Japan)
 Yoko Tawada (Japan/Germany)
 Yūko Tsushima (Japan)
 Wang Anyi (China)
 Wang Wei (China)
 Tian Wen (China)

 Mu Xin (China)
 Can Xue (China)
 Qian Zhongshu (China)

Middle Eastern and Indian literature

 Ilango Adigal (India)
 Ahmed Ali (Pakistan)
 Buddha
 Albert Cossery (Egypt)

 Yoel Hoffmann (Israel)
 Qurratulain Hyder (India)
 Abdelfattah Kilito (Morocco)
 Dunya Mikhail (Iraq)

 Raja Rao (India)
 Aharon Shabtai (Israel)

Bestsellers
 Labyrinths, Jorge Luis Borges
 A Coney Island of the Mind, Lawrence Ferlinghetti
 Siddhartha, Hermann Hesse
 Christie Malry's Own Double-Entry, B. S. Johnson
 Selected Poems, Denise Levertov
 The Air-Conditioned Nightmare, Henry Miller
 Nausea, Jean-Paul Sartre
 Turtle Island, Gary Snyder
 Miss Lonelyhearts & The Day of the Locust, Nathanael West
 The Glass Menagerie, Tennessee Williams
 Selected Poems, William Carlos Williams
 The Cantos, Ezra Pound

References

Further reading
 Laughlin, James. The Way It Wasn't. Ed. Barbara Epler and Daniel Javitch. New York: New Directions, 2006.

External links
New Directions Publishing Website
Will Hall Books-- Checklist of early authors and books published by New Directions Press
Alvin Lustig
New Directions Vice President Declan Spring interviewed on publishing in a recession
The New Inquiry on The New Directions Pearl series

Book publishing companies based in New York (state)
Companies based in New York City
Publishing companies established in 1936
1936 establishments in New York (state)